Sankt Florian am Inn is a municipality in the district of Schärding in the Austrian state of Upper Austria.

Geography
Sankt Florian lies in the Innviertel. About 19 percent of the municipality is forest, and 64 percent is farmland.

References

Cities and towns in Schärding District